Stanisław Olszewski (1852–1898) was a Polish engineer and inventor. He is best known as the co-creator of the technology of arc welding (along with Nikolay Benardos).

Biography 
He studied in Belgium at the University of Liège. Upon his return to Poland (Privislinsky Krai, Russian Empire), he became one of technical directors in the Lilpop, Rau i Loewenstein factory in Warsaw, and then the company's representative for all of Russian Empire. He also served as a general secretary of three Russian technological syndicates and simultaneously started his own company in Sankt Petersburg.

In 1881–82, together with Nikolay Benardos, a Russian engineer, he developed a method of carbon arc welding patented in France in 1885 and in the US in 1887. He was also a known benefactor and sponsor of, among others, the Polish Gymnasium of Cieszyn. He died 15 July 1898 in Giessen. His body was then transported to Poland and buried at the Powązki Cemetery.

References

Links 
  Stanisław Olszewski

1852 births
1898 deaths
19th-century Polish engineers
Polish inventors
University of Liège alumni
Burials at Powązki Cemetery